John Dennis Phelan (March 23, 1809 – September 9, 1879) was an American editor, politician and jurist.

Early life
Phelan was born on March 23, 1809, in New Brunswick, New Jersey.  He was the son of John Phelan (d. 1850), an Irish immigrant, and Priscilla Oakes (née Ford) Phelan (1785–1864), of New England stock, who moved to Richmond and, later, Huntsville, Alabama in 1818.  His father was cashier of the Bank of New Brunswick during the War of 1812.  His brother was James Phelan, Sr., also a jurist and journalist.

He graduated at the University of Nashville in 1828 and studied law in Virginia with the Hon. Benjamin Watkins Leigh.

Career
After being admitted to the bar in Virginia, he returned to Alabama in 1830.  He became editor of the Huntsville Democrat. From 1833 to 1835, he served in the Alabama Legislature as a Democrat representing Madison County, until he became the Attorney General of Alabama in 1836.  After he was succeeded at Attorney General by Lincoln Clark in 1838, he returned to the Legislature where he was elected Speaker of the Alabama House of Representatives in 1839, serving in that role until 1840.

From 1841 to 1851, he was a judge of the circuit court, until his elevation to the Alabama Supreme Court in 1851, holding that office for two years until 1853, and then again in 1863-65 when "he was removed by the 'Reconstruction' carpet-bag ruler of Alabama."  In the interval when he was not a judge in the Alabama Supreme Court, he was clerk to that body, and also later in 1865–68.  He published two poems about Civil War, “Good Old Cause” and “Ye Men of Alabama.” He became professor of law in the University of the South in 1869, holding the chair until his death.

Personal life
On April 16, 1835, he was married to Mary Anne Harris (1815–1870) in Limestone County, Alabama. Her parents were Mary Anne (née Moore) Harris and Gen. Thomas Kent Harris, a native of Virginia who moved to Tennessee and served as a representative of that state in the U.S. Congress from 1813 to 1815.  Together, they were the parents of:

 Thomas Harris Phelan (1836–1862), who died at the Battle of Gaines's Mill during the U.S. Civil War.
 Watkins John Phelan (1838–1863), who died at the Siege of Petersburg during the War.
 Dennis Phelan (1839–1856)
 John Paul Phelan (1841–1890), a captain of Phelan's Light Artillery for the Confederate States Army.
 Ellis Phelan (1843–1897), a fellow judge and clerk of the House of Representatives who was a captain in the 45th Regiment of Alabama Volunteers.
 Priscella Phelan (b. 1846), who married G. A. Williamson in 1881.
 Mary Harris Phelan (1847–1928), who married Robert Leonidas Watt (1844–1886) in 1872.
 Anna King Phelan, who married James Chester Derby in 1884.
 Sidney Harris Phelan (1854–1913), who married Palmer Graham in 1877.
 Caroline Blount Phelan (1856–1948), who married Jesse Drew Beale (1851–1905) in 1877.
 James Lalor Phelan (1859–1899), who married Sallie Tankersley in 1889.

After several months of ill health, Phelan died in Birmingham, Alabama on September 9, 1879.

Descendants
His grandson was Phelan Beale (1881–1956), who formed the law practice of "Bouvier and Beale" with Jacqueline Onassis's grandfather, "Major" John Vernou Bouvier, Jr.  Beale was married to Edith Ewing Bouvier, sister of John Vernou Bouvier III and aunt to Jackie Kennedy.

References

External links

1809 births
1879 deaths
American jurists
American editors
American people of Irish descent
Politicians from Huntsville, Alabama
University of Nashville alumni
Politicians from New Brunswick, New Jersey
Alabama Attorneys General
Democratic Party members of the Alabama House of Representatives
Speakers of the Alabama House of Representatives
Justices of the Supreme Court of Alabama
Sewanee: The University of the South faculty
Lawyers from Huntsville, Alabama
19th-century American politicians
19th-century American judges
19th-century American lawyers